The men's freestyle featherweight was a freestyle wrestling event held as part of the Wrestling at the 1928 Summer Olympics programme. It was the fifth appearance of the event. Featherweight was the second-lightest category, including wrestlers weighing up to 61 kilograms. Kustaa Pihlajamäki, who had won gold in the lighter bantamweight class in 1924, took silver.

Results
Source: Official results; Wudarski

Gold medal round

Silver medal round

Bronze medal round

As Rottenfluc was injured, the single match was scratched and Minder was awarded the bronze medal.

References

Wrestling at the 1928 Summer Olympics